USS Challenge (SP-1015/AT-59/YT-126/YTM-126) was a commercial tugboat acquired by the United States Navy for service in World War I, and remained available for duty during World War II.

The ship was built in 1889 by J. H. Dialogue and Sons, Camden, New Jersey, as the tug Defiance and commandeered by the Navy from the Shipowners & Merchants Tugboat Co., San Francisco, California, on 13 June 1918, delivered on 24 June, and outfitted at Mare Island Navy Yard. Commissioned as USS Defiance (SP-1015) on 29 July 1918. She was renamed USS Challenge on 15 August 1918.

World War I
Challenge towed oil barges between California and Mexico until 31 May 1920, when she arrived at Bremerton, Washington, for duty under the 13th Naval District. She served as a harbor tug at Puget Sound Navy Yard until decommissioned 13 May 1922.
 
Recommissioned and reclassified AT-59 on 21 February 1925, Challenge resumed duty as a yard tug at Puget Sound. On 31 January 1936, she was reclassified YT-126, and on 2 December 1940, decommissioned and placed "in service". Reclassified YTM-126 on 13 April 1944; and on 16 October 1946, transferred to the Maritime Commission for disposal.

References

External links 
 

Ships built by Dialogue & Company
Tugs of the United States Navy
1889 ships
World War II auxiliary ships of the United States
World War I auxiliary ships of the United States
Auxiliary ships of the United States Navy